Gabriele Barbaro (born 17 March 1950) is a former Italian male long-distance runner who competed at one edition of the IAAF World Cross Country Championships at senior level (1973),

References

External links
 Gabriele Barbaro profile at Association of Road Racing Statisticians

1950 births
Living people
Italian male long-distance runners